Matthew Allwood (born 16 November 1992) is an Indigenous Australian professional rugby league footballer who previously played as a  and  for the New Zealand Warriors in the National Rugby League.

Background
Born in Scone, New South Wales, Allwood played his junior football for Farrer Memorial Agricultural High School before being signed by the Canberra Raiders.

Playing career
As a youngster, Allwood played for the Country New South Wales Under 17s and Under 18s teams and the New South Wales Combined High Schools team. In 2011 and 2012, Allwood played for the Canberra Raiders' NYC team before moving on to the Raiders' New South Wales Cup team, the Mount Pritchard Mounties in 2013.

Canberra Raiders
In Round 7 against the Melbourne Storm, Allwood scored his first NRL career try in the Raiders 24-22 last minute win at Canberra Stadium. Allwood finished his debut year in the NRL with him playing in 11 matches and scoring a try for the Raiders. Due to an off-field incident, Allwood was released before the season ended.

New Zealand Warriors
On 20 May 2014 it was announced that Allwood had signed a 3-year contract with the New Zealand Warriors starting in 2015. He joined the Warriors when their pre-season began in November 2014.

References

External links

New Zealand Warriors profile

1992 births
Living people
Australian rugby league players
Canberra Raiders players
Indigenous Australian rugby league players
Mount Pritchard Mounties players
New Zealand Warriors players
Rugby league centres
Rugby league players from Scone, New South Wales
Rugby league wingers